Parliamentary elections were held in Ghana on 29 August 1969, the first since the 1966 coup by the National Liberation Council which toppled the Nkrumah government.

Voters elected the new 140-seat Parliament. Kofi Abrefa Busia, the leader of the Progress Party (which won 105 of the 140 seats) became Prime Minister. There were no presidential elections, as the system adopted was a parliamentary republic. Instead, a ceremonial president, Edward Akufo-Addo, was elected by an electoral college.

Results

By region

See also
List of MPs elected in the 1969 Ghanaian parliamentary election
Busia government

References

External links
1969 National Assembly Election African Elections Database

Elections in Ghana
Ghana
Parliamentary election
Election and referendum articles with incomplete results